MusicDNA may refer to:

 MusicDNA (database): an online ontology describing the underlying structure of the events within musical history
 MusicDNA (file format): a downloadable music file format able to carry additional data, such as lyrics, video and cover art.